The Ruwenzori duiker or Ruwenzori red duiker (Cephalophus rubidus) is a stocky but small antelope found only in the Ruwenzori Mountains between Uganda and, probably, the Democratic Republic of Congo. They may be a subspecies of the black-fronted duiker or the red-flanked duiker.

They have rufous coats, lighter on their underbellies and darker on their backs. Their short, prong-like horns are about 8 cm long.

They are found in subalpine zones above 3,000 meters, where they eat herbs. They are diurnal.

References

External links
Ultimateungulate.com

Duikers
Mammals of Uganda
Rwenzori Mountains
Mammals described in 1901
Taxa named by Oldfield Thomas
Taxobox binomials not recognized by IUCN